Lianzhou or Lian Prefecture was a zhou (prefecture) in imperial China in modern Guangxi, China. It existed (intermittently) from 634 to 1381. Between 742 and 758 it was known as Hepu Commandery.

Counties
Lian Prefecture administered the following counties (縣) through history: Hepu (合浦), Shikang (石康), Cailong (蔡龍), Dalian (大廉), and Fengshan (封山). Its administrative area corresponds to modern Beihai, Hepu County, and Pubei County.

References

 
 
 

Prefectures of the Tang dynasty
Prefectures of Southern Han
Guangnan West Circuit
Prefectures of the Yuan dynasty
Prefectures of the Ming dynasty
Former prefectures in Guangxi